Sihon was an Amorite king mentioned in the Hebrew Bible, who refused to let the Israelites pass through his country.

Biblical accounts

The Book of Numbers recounts that as the Israelites making their Exodus journey came to the country east of the Jordan, near Heshbon, King Siḥon of the Amorites refused to let them pass through his land:

"But Sihon would not allow Israel to pass through his territory. So Sihon gathered all his people together and went out against Israel in the wilderness, and he came to Jahaz and fought against Israel. Then Israel defeated him with the edge of the sword, and took possession of his land from the Arnon to the Jabbok, as far as the people of Ammon ..."

Moses allocated the land of Sihon, the king of Heshbon, to the Tribe of Gad in the allocation of land to the Israelite tribes.

In a similar way, the Israelites took the country of Og, and these two victories gave them possession of continuous land east of the Jordan, from the Arnon to the foot of Mount Hermon.

Analysis
Biblical historian Joel S. Baden discusses the similarities between the encounter with Sihon and the earlier encounter with the king of Edom, as well as a later parallel passage.

References

External links

Torah monarchs
Amorite kings
Massacres in the Bible